A class of groups is a set theoretical collection of groups satisfying the property that if G is in the collection then every group isomorphic to G is also in the collection. This concept arose from the necessity to work with a bunch of groups satisfying certain special property (for example finiteness or commutativity).  Since set theory does not admit the "set of all groups", it is necessary to work with the more general concept of class.

Definition 

A class of groups  is a collection of groups such that if  and  then . Groups in the class  are referred to as -groups.

For a set of groups , we denote by  the smallest class of groups containing . In particular for a group ,  denotes its isomorphism class.

Examples 

The most common examples of classes of groups are:
 : the empty class of groups
 : the class of cyclic groups.
 : the class of abelian groups.
 : the class of finite supersolvable groups
 : the class of nilpotent groups
 : the class of finite solvable groups
 : the class of finite simple groups
 : the class of finite groups
 : the class of all groups

Product of classes of groups

Given two classes of groups  and  it is defined the product of classes

This construction allows us to recursively define the power of a class by setting

 and 

It must be remarked that this binary operation on the class of classes of groups is neither associative nor commutative. However  has no non-trivial normal cyclic subgroup, so . Then .

Class maps and closure operations

A class map c is a map which assigns a class of groups  to another class of groups . A class map is said to be a closure operation if it satisfies the next properties:
 c is expansive: 
 c is idempotent: 
 c is monotonic: If  then 

Some of the most common examples of closure operations are:

References

See also
Formation
Properties of groups
Group theory
Algebraic structures